Tarbagatai National Park (Tarbağatai ūlttyq parkı), also Tarbagatay, was established in 2018 to protect a region of mountain-steppe in East Kazakhstan that supports stands of wild fruit trees that have been isolated from genetic encroachment by commercial varieties.

Topography
The Tarbagatai Mountain range runs west-to-east for about 250 km, starting about 70 km southeast of the regional city of Ayagoz.  The main body of the park runs along the south slope of the ridge. Additional clusters cover areas of the Karabas Mountains, Arkaly Mountains, and valleys of the Urzhar and Emel rivers.

Climate and ecoregion
The climate of Tarbagatai is Humid continental climate, warm summer (Köppen climate classification (Dfb)).

Flora and fauna
The region is one of high biodiversity, with over 1,600 species of vascular plants identified, 270 of birds, 19 of fishes, 23 of reptiles, and 80 species of mammals.

See also
 List of national parks of Kazakhstan

References

External links

National parks of Kazakhstan
Protected areas established in 2018
2018 establishments in Kazakhstan